Antiseptic Dorogov's Stimulator (ASD) is an antiseptic drug invented by A. V. Dorogov in the 1940s in the former USSR.

History 
ASD was originally invented by Russian researcher A. V. Dorogov in the 1940s and initially kept secret and allowed only for army and special services use. Since the 1990s it has been produced in a biochemical factory in Armavir and registered in Russia as official drug for animal-only usage and recommended for skin diseases in pigs and cows.

Properties and production 
Attributed strong anti-carcinogenic and anti-viral properties, the production process is described as "thermal processing of animal-origin tissues." The final product is a dark fluid with a very strong and specific odour. Available in two fractions - "third", denser, is to be administered on skin, "second" fraction - orally.

See also 

 Drug policy of the Soviet Union

Literature

References

Antiseptics